Aerangis luteoalba is a species of epiphytic orchid native to eastern and central Africa. This species includes 2 currently recognized varieties:

 Aerangis luteoalba var. luteoalba - Uganda, Congo-Brazzaville, Congo-Kinshasa (Zaire, Democratic Republic of the Congo)
 Aerangis luteoalba var. rhodosticta (Kraenzl.) J. Stewart (1979) (synonyms: Angraecum rhodostictum Kraenzl. (1896) (Basionym), Angorchis rhodosticta (Kraenzl.) Kuntze (1903), Angraecum albidorubrum De Wild. (1916), Aerangis rhodosticta (Kraenzl.) Schltr. (1918), Aerangis albidorubra (De Wild.) Schltr. (1918), Angraecum mirabile auct. (1923)) - Cabinda, Central African Republic, Cameroon, Ethiopia, Kenya, Tanzania, Uganda, Congo-Brazzaville, Congo-Kinshasa (Zaire, Democratic Republic of the Congo)

References

External links
 

luteoalba
Epiphytic orchids
Plants described in 1895
Flora of West-Central Tropical Africa
Flora of East Tropical Africa
Flora of Ethiopia